Hubert Best (born 1952) was an English cathedral organist, who served in St. Philip's Cathedral, Birmingham.

Background

Hubert Best was born on 24 March 1952 in Durban, South Africa. He was educated at Rhodes University.

He studied organ at the Royal Academy of Music.

Career

Assistant Organist of :
St. Philip's Cathedral, Birmingham

Organist of:
St. Philip's Cathedral, Birmingham 1978 - 1985
Lutheran Church of the Redeemer, Jerusalem
St. James' Church, Muswell Hill

References

English classical organists
British male organists
Cathedral organists
1952 births
Alumni of the Royal Academy of Music
Rhodes University alumni
Living people
Musicians from Durban
21st-century organists
21st-century British male musicians
Male classical organists